Dazzle Dreams is a Ukrainian electronic band formed in 2006 in Kyiv. Dazzle Dreams released four studio albums.

Members 
 Dmytro Tsyperdyuk (singing)
 Serhiy Hera (Shura) (keyboards)
 Greg Ihnatovych (arrangement)

Discography 
 2007 — Dazzle Dreams
 2008 — D.Dreams Sound System-Nepal
 2009 — (Go! Go! Go!) Disco killers
 2012 — Diva

Links 
 Official page

Electronic music groups
Musical groups established in 2006
2006 establishments in Ukraine
Ukrainian musical groups